The 2010 Dubai World Cup was a horse race held at Meydan Racecourse on Saturday 27 March 2010. It was the 15th running of the Dubai World Cup. It was the first edition of the Dubai World Cup to be run at Meydan on the synthetic Tapeta surface.

The winner was Stud Estrela Energia's Brazilian-bred Glória de Campeão, a seven-year-old bay horse trained in France by Pascal Bary and ridden by T. J. Pereira. Glória de Campeão's victory was the first in the race for his jockey, trainer and owner and the first for a horse trained in France.

Glória de Campeão had been trained in Brazil in the early part of his career before being transferred to the Bary's French stable in 2007. Although based in France, he was campaigned internationally, racing in Singapore, the United States and Dubai, finishing second in the 2009 Dubai World Cup on dirt and winning the Singapore Airlines International Cup on turf. In the 2010 Dubai World Cup he started a 16/1 outsider and won by a nose from the South African gelding Lizard's Desire, with the Godolphin runner Allybar a short head away in third. The 100/30 favourite Gitano Hernando finished sixth of the fourteen runners.

Race details
 Sponsor: Emirates Airline
 Purse: £6,172,840; First prize: £3,703,704
 Surface: Tapeta
 Going: Standard
 Distance: 10 furlongs
 Number of runners: 14
 Winner's time: 2:03.83

Full result

 Abbreviations: nse = nose; nk = neck; shd = head; hd = head; nk = neck

Winner's details
Further details of the winner, Glória de Campeão
 Sex: Stallion
 Foaled: 29 September 2003
 Country: Brazil
 Sire: Impression; Dam: Audacity (Clackson)
 Owner: Stud Estrela Energia
 Breeder: Haras Santarém

References

Dubai World Cup
Dubai World Cup
Dubai World Cup
Dubai World Cup